Halva Cheshmeh (also Romanized as Ḩalvā Cheshmeh) is a village in Qushkhaneh-ye Pain Rural District, Qushkhaneh District, Shirvan County, North Khorasan Province, Iran. At the 2020 census, its population was 482, in 106 families.

References 

Populated places in Shirvan County